Beaverdam Brook is a tributary of Lawrence Brook in central East Brunswick, New Jersey in the United States.

Course
It crosses Dutch Road and the New Jersey Turnpike. It flows under Hardenburg Lane, and goes through the Tamarack County Golf Course.

Accessibility
This stream crosses many roads and runs through a golf course, both of which make it easily accessible.

Sister tributaries
Great Ditch
Ireland Brook
Oakeys Brook
Sawmill Brook
Sucker Brook
Terhune Run
Unnamed Brook in Rutgers Gardens, unofficially named Doc Brook
Unnamed Brook in Rutgers' Helyar Woods

See also
List of rivers of New Jersey

References

External links
USGS Coordinates in Google Maps

East Brunswick, New Jersey
Rivers of Middlesex County, New Jersey
Tributaries of the Raritan River
Rivers of New Jersey